The Port of Ramsgate (also known as Port Ramsgate, Ramsgate Harbour, and Royal Harbour, Ramsgate) is a harbour situated in Ramsgate, south-east England, serving cross-Channel freight traffic and smaller working and pleasure craft. It is owned and operated by Thanet District Council.

History

The construction of Ramsgate Harbour began in 1749 and was completed in about 1850. The two most influential architects of the harbour were father and son John Shaw and John Shaw Jr, who designed the clockhouse, the obelisk, the lighthouse and the Jacob's Ladder steps.

The harbour has the unique distinction of being the only harbour in the United Kingdom awarded the right to call itself a Royal Harbour. This was bestowed by King George IV after he was taken by the hospitality shown by the people of Ramsgate when he used the harbour to depart and return with the Royal Yacht Squadron in 1821.

Because of its proximity to mainland Europe, Ramsgate was a chief embarkation point both during the Napoleonic Wars and for the Dunkirk evacuation in 1940. The ferry terminal area is built upon reclaimed land.

Passenger and freight services
Helped by its position  from the French coast, the port provided cross-Channel crossings for many years, with Ramsgate Port having its own access tunnel avoiding town centre congestion.

Ferries

Previously Sally Ferries provided a service of passenger and car ferries to Dunkirk. Between November 1998 and April 2013 a predominantly freight service was provided to Ostend by TransEuropa Ferries. Passenger services were only available on certain crossings, and then only with vehicles.

Hovercraft
Hoverlloyd ran a crossing from Ramsgate Harbour to Calais from 6 April 1966 using small, passenger-only SR.N6 hovercraft. When the much larger SR.N4 craft, capable of carrying 30 vehicles and 254 passengers, were delivered in 1969, Hoverlloyd moved operations to a purpose-built hoverport in Pegwell Bay, near Ramsgate, which closed in 1987.

Recent years
Since 2013, there have been no ferry services from Ramsgate. Between 2012–13 and 2014–15, the port recorded a loss of £2.7 million, and it was suggested it should be closed. In 2016, Gefco commenced using the port to import and store cars prior to onward distribution.

The port however continued to make losses, with a further loss of £2.5 million in the year 2018–19, and only limited activity in the commercial port. In 2019, Seaborne Freight was awarded a £13.8m freight contract to Ostend which could be used in the event of a no deal Brexit, but this was ruled out as impractical.

Royal Harbour Marina

The Royal Harbour has a large marina, primarily based in the inner pool of the original harbour, with water levels controlled by lock gates containing 700 berths, although a number of other berths are also available in the outer harbour, and so can be accessed around the clock, rather than just either side of high tide when the gates open.

The marina has a number of facilities for sailors, including refuelling, utility hook-ups and amenity blocks.

The lighthouse situated on the West harbour arm was built in 1842 and is 11m high; it is a Grade II listed building. The lighthouse is active and emits a continuous red light; (originally the light varied from red to green depending on the height of the tide at the harbour entrance). It replaced an earlier lighthouse by Benjamin Dean Wyatt, which had been poorly positioned and suffered damage from passing ships. Now powered by electricity, originally it was lit by an oil lamp, with a fourth-order Fresnel lens. Carved in the stonework of the lighthouse are the words 'PERFUGIAM MISERIS', which are translated as 'refuge for those in need'.

Lifeboat station

A lifeboat station was first established at Ramsgate Harbour in 1802 by the trustees of the harbour, predating the formation of any national lifeboat organisation by more than 20 years. The original was built by lifeboat pioneer Henry Greathead, in the same year that he was recognised by parliament for the lifeboat being "deemed a fit subject for national munificence".

After a lapse in service between 1824 and 1851 a station was re-established by the trustees, with the lifeboat named in honour of the lifeboat sponsor, the Duke of Northumberland. The new and prized boat had been built in accordance with the plans of a model that had been the prize-winner in the 1851 national competition for the best design for such a craft.

In 1859 Jerimiah Walker (having previously distinguished himself by his successful rescue of the master and crew of the Northern Belle), as a seaman on the lugger Petrel, assisted in the rescue of the crew of the Spanish vessel Julia, which had become stranded off Ramsgate. For this assistance he was awarded a medal struck on the authority of Queen Isabella II of Spain.

On New Year's Day 1861 an event at sea of considerable loss of life occurred with the wreck of the Guttenburg. Then, as now, the most hazardous area around the Kent coastline for any navigator was the Goodwin Sands.

In 1865, the lifeboat was taken over by the Board of Trade and the Royal National Lifeboat Institution, and was taken over completely by the RNLI, which runs the service to this day. The current lifeboat station, on the harbour wall between the inner and outer pools of the main harbour, opened in 1998 and services both an onshore lifeboat, the 'Bob Turnbull' and offshore lifeboat, the 'RNLB Esme Anderson'.

Offshore wind farm
The Thanet Offshore Wind Project required the construction of a 280m quay for the assembly of wind turbines. Turbines for the London Array are maintained from an operations and maintenance base at the port.

Walkway collapse
On 14 September 1994 there was a failure of a ship-to-shore structure for the transfer of foot passengers onto ferries. While RMT's Prins Filip was docked and loading vehicles and passengers, and getting readied for the voyage to Ostend in Belgium, the walkway collapsed, causing the deaths of six people and seriously injuring seven more. The investigation into the accident revealed that the same basic miscalculation had been made by both the designer (Swedish firm FKAB, a subsidiary of the Mattson Group) and certifying organisation Lloyd's Register. The parties involved, including the client, Port Ramsgate, were prosecuted and fined a total of £1.7m, which at the time was the largest fine in the United Kingdom for a breach of health and safety laws.

 The Swedish firms refused to pay the £1m fine and as result pan-European law enforcement was changed in 2005.

See also
 Channel Ports
 Ramsgate Maritime Museum
 The Royal Harbour Academy

References

External links
 Port of Ramsgate
 Ramsgate lifeboat
 Transeuropa Ferries (Ramsgate-Oostende)
 Sally line and Ramsgate

Marinas in England
Ports and harbours of Kent
Ramsgate